The 10th Airlift Squadron (10 AS) was part of the 62d Airlift Wing at McChord Air Force Base, Washington. It operated C-17 Globemaster III aircraft supporting the United States Air Force global reach mission worldwide.

Mission
To train and equip C-17 aircrews for global air-land and airdrop operations.

History

World War II

Established as part of the Army Air Corps in January 1938 at Olmsted Field, Pennsylvania but not activated until 1 December 1940. Not equipped or manned.   Unit designation transferred to Westover Field, Massachusetts, but not equipped or manned until after the Pearl Harbor Attack.   Equipped with C-47 Skytrain transports and trained for combat resupply and casualty evacuation mission.

Was ordered deployed to England, assigned to Eighth Air Force in June 1942.  Assigned fuselage code 7D.  Performed intro-theater transport flights of personnel, supply and equipment within England during summer and fall of 1942, reassigned to Twelfth Air Force after Operation Torch invasion of North Africa, stationed at Tafaraoui Airfield, Algeria.    In combat, performed resupply and evacuation missions across Morocco, Algeria and Tunisia during North African Campaign.  During June 1943, the unit began training with gliders in preparation for Operation Husky, the invasion of Sicily.  It towed gliders to Syracuse, Sicily and dropped paratroopers at Catania during the operation.  After moving to Sicily, the squadron airdropped supplies to escaped prisoners of war in Northern Italy in October. Operated from Sicily until December until moving to Italian mainland in December.

Supported Italian Campaign during balance of 1944 supporting partisans in the Balkans.  Its unarmed aircraft flew at night over uncharted territory, landing at small unprepared airfields to provide guns, ammunition, clothing, medical supplies, gasoline, and mail to the partisans.  It even carried jeeps and mules as cargo.  On return trips it evacuated wounded partisans, evadees and escaped prisoners.  These operations earned the squadron the Distinguished Unit Citation.  It also dropped paratroopers at Megava, Greece in October 1944 and propaganda leaflets in the Balkans in the Mediterranean Theater of Operations until end of combat in Europe, May 1945.

After hostilities ended, was transferred to Waller Field, Trinidad attached to the Air Transport Command Transported personnel and equipment from Brazil to South Florida along the South Atlantic Air Transport Route.  Squadron picked up personnel and equipment in Brazil or bases in Northern South America with final destination being Miami, Boca Raton Army Airfield or Morrison Fields in South Florida.

Occupation and Cold War
Was reassigned to the United States Air Forces in Europe (USAFE), September 1946, performing intro-theater cargo flights based at Munich-Riem Airport.   Transferred to Kaufbeuren AB when Riem Airport was closed. Was re-equipped with C-54 Skymaster aircraft and deployed to RAF Fassberg during 1948 Berlin Airlift.  Flew continuous missions across hostile Soviet Zone of Germany in Berlin Air Corridor, transporting supplies and equipment to airports in West Berlin, 1948–1949.  Later operated from Rhein-Main AB and Wiesbaden AB in American Zone of Occupation, later West Germany until blockade ended. Remained as part of USAFE until 1961, being upgraded to C-82 and later C-119 Flying Boxcar transports as part of USAFE 322d Air Division based in West Germany and France.  Inactivated as part of downsizing of USAFE bases in France, 1961.

Special airlift
Was briefly reactivated in the late 1960s at Chanute AFB, Illinois as a VT-29A VIP transport squadron as part of Tactical Air Command. Conducted airlift tasks in connection with aircraft delivery; in 1970 re-equipped with C-131 Samaritan medical evacuation aircraft.   Inactivated September 1970.

European shuttle

Reassigned to USAFE and reactivated in 1984 with C-23 short-range transports for personnel movements within USAFE.  Flew scheduled flights from Zweibrücken, Ramstein and other USAFE bases, replacing C-130 European Shuttle flights.  Inactivated March 1991 as part of USAFE drawdown at the end of the Cold War.

Globemaster training
Reactivated in 2003 as C-17 aircrew training squadron at McChord AFB, Washington. On 1 September 2011 more than 100 Airmen from the 10th Airlift Squadron returned from a 120-day deployment at an undisclosed Middle East location in support of Operations Enduring Freedom and New Dawn. 
 
In December 2014 the Air Force announced that the 10th would be inactivated by the summer of 2016. For the fifth time in its 76-year history, the 10th Airlift Squadron was inactivated on 6 May 2016.

Lineage
 Constituted as the 10th Transport Squadron on 1 January 1938
 Activated on 1 December 1940
 Redesignated 10th Troop Carrier Squadron on 5 July 1942
 Inactivated on 31 July 1945
 Activated on 30 September 1946
 Redesignated 10th Troop Carrier Squadron, Medium on 1 July 1948
 Redesignated 10th Troop Carrier Squadron, Heavy on 5 November 1948
 Redesignated 10th Troop Carrier Squadron, Medium on 16 November 1949
 Discontinued and inactivated on 8 January 1961
 Redesignated 10th Air Transport Squadron on 5 September 1969
 Activated on 15 October 1969
 Inactivated on 30 September 1970
 Redesignated 10th Military Airlift Squadron on 1 November 1983
 Activated on 15 January 1984
 Inactivated on 31 March 1991
 Redesignated 10th Airlift Squadron on 17 December 2002
 Activated on 1 October 2003
 Inactivated on 6 May 2016

Assignments
 VIII Corps Area, 1 January 1938 (not active)
 60th Transport Group (later 60th Troop Carrier Group), 1 December 1940 – 31 July 1945
 60th Troop Carrier Group, 30 September 1946 (attached to 313th Troop Carrier Group 26 Nov 1948 – 16 May 1949, 60th Troop Carrier Wing after 15 November 1956) 
 60th Troop Carrier Wing, 12 March 1957
 322d Air Division, 25 September 1958 – 8 January 1961
 2d Aircraft Delivery Group, 15 October 1969 – 30 September 1970
 322d Airlift Division, 15 January 1984
 608th Military Airlift Group, 15 March 1984 – 31 March 1991
 62d Operations Group, 1 October 2003 – 6 May 2016

Stations

 Olmsted Field, Pennsylvania, 1 December 1940
 Westover Field, Massachusetts, 21 May 1941 – 20 May 1942
 RAF Chelveston, England, 11 June 1942
 RAF Aldermaston, England, 7 August 1942
 Tafaraoui Airfield, Algeria, 8 November 1942
 Relizane Airfield, Algeria, c. 27 November 1942
 Thiersville Airfield, Algeria, c. 14 May 1943
 El Djem Airfield, Tunisia, 26 June 1943
 Gela Airfield, Sicily, 6 September 1943
 Gerbini Airfield, Sicily, c. 7 November 1943
 Pomigliano Airfield, Italy, 12 December 1943
 Brindisi Airfield, Italy, 6 April 1944
 Pomigliano Airfield, Italy, 25 October 1944 – 23 May 1945
 Waller Field, Trinidad, 4 June – 31 July 1945

 AAF Station Munich-Reim, Germany, 30 September 1946
 Kaufbeuren Air Base, Germany, 8 May 1948
 Wiesbaden Air Base, Germany, 10 August 1948
 Kaufbeuren Air Base, Germany, 18 October 1948 (operated from RAF Fassberg, West Germany after 26 November 1948)
 Wiesbaden Air Base, West Germany, 16 May 1949
 Rhein-Main Air Base, West Germany, 26 September 1949
 Wiesbaden Air Base, West Germany, 20 October 1949
 Rhein-Main Air Base, West Germany, 5 July 1950
 Dreux-Louvilliers Air Base, France, 23 September 1955 – 8 January 1961
 Chanute Air Force Base, Illinois, 15 October 1969 – 30 September 1970
 Zweibrücken Air Base, West Germany, 15 January 1984 – 31 March 1991
 McChord Air Force Base, Washington, 1 October 2003 – 6 May 2016

Aircraft

C-47 Skytrain (1942–1945, 1946–1948)
C-54 Skymaster (1948–1949)
C-82 Packet (1949–1953)
C-119 Flying Boxcar (1953–1960)

VT-29A (1969–1970)
C-131 Samaritan (1969–1970)
C-23 (1984–1990)
C-17 Globemaster III (2003–2016)

References

Bibliography

 
 
 

0010
Military units and formations in Washington (state)